Tory K. Baucum (born 1960) Tory Baucum is the Director for the Benedictine Center for Family Life, Atchison, KS.  After 30 years of ministry as Anglican Pastor, Seminary and University Professor, he and his wife, Elizabeth, converted to the Catholic Church.  They were prepared by Fathers Dominic Legge, O.P. and Pastor Paul Scalia of the Arlington Diocese and received by Archbishop Joseph Naumann of Archdiocese of Kansas City, KS.

During the first decade of the 20th century Baucum served as pastor in an Anglican church in Virginia. He and the Bishop Shannon Johnston of the Episcopal diocese of Virginia settled an ongoing lawsuit. The Anglican congregation remained in the historic building rent-free with only a commitment to continue the peacemaking in a formal way.  This was so unusual, it was highlighted in the Catholic Journal, Commonweal and featured in Easter edition of the New York Times.  The work continued with the establishment of a Peace Institute and an ecumenical board made up of Jews, Black Pentecostals, Catholics and Episcopalians such as Rev. Eugene Rivers, Rabbi Marc Gopin and Bishop Shannon Johnston.

After Professor Baucum’s conversion he continued the work he began with Rev. Rivers, Rabbi Gopin and Bishop Johnston.  On a recent reconciliation trip to Poland, the government commended Rabbi Gopin and  Professor Baucum and invited them to continue consulting and building up domestic church leaders to counteract the effects of Putin’s Christian Nationalist war on Ukraine.

Baucum now works on a comprehensive vision of peace with the family as the basis of peace in the church, society and world internationally, all on display in Poland’s current and heroic domestic church mission.  The work begun in Virginia   has taken root and flourishes in Kansas.

On February 19, Professor Baucum was inducted to the Copernican Society In Toruń Poland.

References

External links
"Archbishop appoints US priest as Canterbury preacher", Archbishop of Canterbury website

1960 births
Living people
American Anglican Church in North America priests
Anglo-Catholics
American Roman Catholics
Converts to Roman Catholicism from Anglicanism
Anglican realignment people